Torchy Gets Her Man is a 1938 American comedy-drama film directed by William Beaudine and starring Glenda Farrell as Torchy Blane and Barton MacLane as Detective Steve McBride. It was released on November 12, 1938. It is the sixth film in a series of Torchy Blane films by Warner Bros. The film is followed by Torchy Blane in Chinatown (1939).

Plot
Torchy Blane (Glenda Farrell) is in the police station when a secret service agent Charles Gilbert (Willard Robertson) ask the police for help in catching "$100 Bailey", a counterfeiter who has eluded police capture for fifteen years and is passing hundred dollar bills. Charles tells detective Steve McBride (Barton MacLane) that he suspects Bailey will pass the money at the racetrack. He recruits the police in a sting operation at the local racetrack to catch Bailey and convinces Steve to let him watch the $100 betting window.

Unknown to the police, Charles Gilbert is actually Bailey. He intends to use his position at the racetrack to pass off and launder his phony bills for the real thing, together with a number of his accomplices posing as horse bettors. Captain McTavish dispatches Sergeant Gahagan (Tom Kennedy) with a letter to confirm Charles Gilbert's identity. Charles switches Captain McTavish's letter with one written by a member of his gang, and his cover is maintained. Captain McTavish forbids Steve to tell Torchy about the investigation. She is annoyed at Steve when he keeps her in the dark about the counterfeit ring he is tracking down. Gahagan is at Hollywood Race Track with a foolproof system, involving higher mathematics, that he uses to almost break the track. This draws attention to him, by not only the counterfeiters and racetrack officials but also by Torchy, who's at the track tracking down Steve.

Determined to get her story, Torchy follows Charles from the racetrack. Charles notices her on his tail and loses her. Torchy writes the story in her newspaper, but her editor explains that they have been asked by the police not to publish anything on the subject, in order to keep the operation secret. Torchy is still suspicious of Charles and marks his automobile tire with creosote. She borrows a German Shepherd named Blitzen from a local pet store to track the scent. With Gahagan's help, Torchy discovers Charles's hideout, but they are spotted by Charles's men and kidnapped, and held captive by the counterfeit ring as a hostage. Torchy and Gahagan are tied up and a nitroglycerin bomb is set to go off after the criminals leave the house. Torchy sends the dog to get help. Meanwhile, Steve has begun to worry about Torchy and Charles' response makes him suspicious. Blitzen shows up at the police station and leads Steve, a squad of police and Charles to the gang's hiding place. Charles, not wanting to be at the house where he knows the bomb is set to go off, is exposed as Bailey and forced to reveal where the bomb and the captives are. Torchy and Gahagan are rescued by Steve and Charles are arrested.

Cast
 Glenda Farrell as Torchy Blane  
 Barton MacLane as Steve McBride  
 Tom Kennedy as Gahagan  
 Willard Robertson as Charles Gilbert  
 Thomas E. Jackson as Gloomy

Home media
Warner Archive released a boxed set DVD collection featuring all nine Torchy Blane films on March 29, 2011.

References

External links
 
 
 
 

1930s crime films
American black-and-white films
American crime films
American detective films
Films about journalists
Films directed by William Beaudine
Warner Bros. films
Counterfeit money in film
Torchy Blane films
1930s English-language films
1930s American films